SAARF may refer to:

 Special Allied Airborne Reconnaissance Force
 South African Audience Research Foundation, a non-profit organization which publishes media audience and product/brand research.